Thane is a masculine given name and a surname. It may refer to:

Surname
 Amanda Thane (1953–2012), Australian operatic soprano
 Bartlett L. Thane (1877–1927), American mining engineer, namesake of the Juneau neighborhood
 Elswyth Thane (1900–1984), American romance novelist
 Lucy Thane (born 1967), British documentary filmmaker, event producer and performer
 Pat Thane, British history professor

Given name
 Thane Baker (born 1931), American former sprinter
 Thane Bettany (1929–2015), English actor
 Thane Campbell (1895–1978), Canadian politician and jurist, 19th premier of Prince Edward Island
 Thane Camus (born 1970), French-American screen actor
 Thane Gash (born 1965), American former National Football League player
 Thane Gustafson (born 1944), political scientist
 Thane Houser (1891–1967), American race car driver
 Thane Maynard, American zookeeper
 Thane Rosenbaum (born 1960), American novelist, essayist and law professor

Fictional characters
 Thane (comics), a Marvel Comics character
 Thane Krios, a character in the video game Mass Effect 2 Thane Whitefield

Masculine given names
Surnames from given names